

The 2021 Sunderland City Council election took place on 6 May 2021 to elect members of Sunderland City Council in England on the same day as other elections across the United Kingdom.

Background 
The local elections held in 2021 were originally scheduled for 7 May 2020, but were postponed due to the coronavirus pandemic, and held on 6 May 2021. There were 28 seats up for election: one-third of the seats on the council, plus three additional vacancies in the Copt Hill, Shiney Row, and Washington South wards.

Vacancies had arisen in the Copt Hill and Houghton Wards ahead of the local elections as the former Labour councillors, Jack Cunningham and Alex Scullion respectively, resigned from the council during 2020. In Shiney Row, there was an additional vacancy due to the death in office of Labour councillor Geoff Walker in January 2021. The vacancy in the Washington South ward arose with the resignation in March 2021 of the council's only sitting Green Party councillor, Dom Armstrong, following disagreements with his party about trans rights issues.

There had been speculation ahead of the election that the Labour Party could lose overall control of Sunderland City Council for the first time in its history. Conservative group leader Antony Mullen said that he was 'prepared to form coalition to kick out Labour.'

The Labour Party and Conservatives fielded 28 candidates in the election. The Liberal Democrats fielded 23 candidates, the Green Party 21 and UKIP 19. In addition, there was one Independent, one Populist Party and one Communist Party candidate.

Election results 
After the election, the Labour Party maintained control of the council. Labour's majority was reduced to nine, having lost 9 seats. In Washington South, the Conservatives gained the seat vacated by the Green Party, but the Labour incumbent held on to the other. Labour also lost to the Conservatives in Ryhope and St Anne's - wards that had been won by UKIP in the 2019 local elections. The Conservatives made further gains from Labour in St Peter's, St Chad's and Barnes.

Meanwhile, the Liberal Democrats gained seats with large swings from Labour in Sandhill, Pallion, Doxford and Hendon. Fulwell turned out to be a close contest between the Conservatives and Liberal Democrats - pushing Labour into their only third-place position in the city.

Labour leader Graeme Miller described the results as 'very disappointing', commenting that "the UKIP vote across the city moved to the Conservatives, at the same time they received a 10% bump in their vote because the public are happy with the vaccine rollout, and we’ve lost councillors as a result." There were nonetheless some positives for Labour; with strong performances in some of the towns and villages outside Sunderland, winning a close contest in Silksworth, and holding all four seats in the two-up elections in Copt Hill and Shiney Row wards.

Council composition
In the last council, the composition of the council was:

After the election, the composition of the council was:

Lib Dem - Liberal Democrats
G - Greens

Ward results  
% Change from 2019

Barnes

Castle

Copt Hill

Doxford

Fulwell

Hendon

Hetton

Houghton

Millfield

Pallion

Redhill

Ryhope

Sandhill

Shiney Row

Silksworth

Southwick

St Anne's

St Chad's

St Michael's

St Peter's

Washington Central

Washington East

Washington North

Washington South 

*Cllr Paul Donaghy defected to Reform UK on January 16, 2023.

Washington West

By-elections

Hetton

Redhill

References 

Sunderland
Sunderland City Council elections